Fabrizio Tarducci (born 17 October 1976), better known as Fabri Fibra, is an Italian rapper. In his career he has sold more than 2.3 millions of certified copies.

Biography 
Tarducci was born in Senigallia, Marche. He became interested in music from a young age; he wrote and performed his first piece when he was 17 years old.

In 1995 he recorded his first demo. He created the tandem Uomini di Mare with DJ Lato, beatmaker and deejay, and in 1996 they produced the underground CD Dei del mare quest'el gruv. In 1999 Fabri and Lato produced and distributed the LP Sindrome di fine millennio ("End of Millennium Syndrome"), with collaborations from El Presidente (also known as Esa), Inoki, Joe Cassano and his brother Nesli.

Following his underground success, Fabri Fibra began performing around Italy. In 2000 he established his label and group Teste Mobili Records (Bobbing Head Records), and collaborated with various Italian rap groups, lending vocals as well as lyrics to the mixtape circuit.
In his career he has sold more than two million certified copies.

In 2013 he campaigned for Adidas Originals, reinterpreting the song of the Run DMC and dj A-Trak.

Solo career

Turbe Giovanili (2002) 
In 2002 Fabri released his first solo album, titled Turbe giovanili (Juvenile Troubles), for which he wrote and recorded his lyrics under the production and arrangement of Neffa. A year later Fabri distributed Lato e Fabri Fibra which brought a close to the partnership with Lato and the Uomini di mare project with aky il grande.

Nesli's Home and Fabri Fibra's Mr. Simpatia were released simultaneously on 1 September 2004.

Mr. Simpatia (2004) 
Released in 2004, Mr. Simpatia (Mr. Niceness) is Fibra's second solo album. All the instrumental bases were made by his younger brother, the rapper Nesli Rice, with the exceptions of "Non Ti Invidio" ("I Don't Envy You") (made by Bassi Maestro) and the album's bonus track (by Bosca).

The album cover shows Fibra's head lying on its side with a gruesome injury. Mr. Simpatia is an ironic title; the tracks' main themes are the Italian hip hop scene, contempt for society, relationships with girls, and Fibra's frustration about his job.

Tradimento (2006) 

After splitting from his recording company contract at Vibrarecords, Fabri went underground and went unheard from for a year, until he resurfaced with a new deal at major recording company Universal Music. Under the production of Fish and brother Nesli Fabri created his most commercially and artistically successful album, Tradimento ("Betrayal"). His first single, released in Europe 4 April 2006, was "Applausi per Fibra" ("Applause for Fibra"). The single discussed Fibra's personal and life experiences overcome by Fabri himself, with a certain emphasis on self-praise.

Only a week after the official launch (6 June 2006) the album reached the number one spot in album sales. However it was criticized for its use of expletives, indifference in its presentation of provocative themes, and its misogynist views of women, all of which were found across the album.

Following the success of "Applausi per Fibra", the second single, "Mal di Stomaco" ("Stomachache"), which gained instant infamy, most notably for the originality of its music video (a fabricated broadcast of SKY TG24 - a Satellite news station) that reports on the death of Fabri Fibra in a car accident. The authenticity is sealed with "live coverage" reports, interviews from famous stars such as Fernanda Lessa, Éva Henger, Jimmy Ghione, producer Fish, rapper Vacca and brother Nesli. The video ends with Fabri's body disappearing from the morgue.

The last single is "Idee stupide" ("Stupid Ideas"), with a black and white video which, whilst not as original as the former video, uses a Rocky-style montage that complements Fabri's underdog lyrics.

In 2010, Tradimento came second in a newspaper poll, making it the second most important album of the decade in Italy.

Bugiardo (2008) 

Fabri Fibra's next album Bugiardo, came out on 9 November 2007, after the release of the street-single "Questo è il nuovo singolo" ("This is the new single"). The first official single, "Bugiardo", came out on 15 October 2007 and the second official single being "La Soluzione" ("The Solution"), which came out on 9 November 2007. On 25 April 2008, Fibra released the single “In Italia” featuring singer Gianna Nannini. The song became a massive summer hit, being the most watched music video in Italy of 2008 and earning a nomination at the MTV Europe Music Awards for Best Italian Act.

Chi Vuole Essere Fabri Fibra?  (2009) 
On 10 April 2009, Fibra released his fifth album, entitled Chi vuole essere Fabri Fibra? (Who Wants To Be Fabri Fibra?) He released two songs from the album, entitled "Incomprensioni" ("Incomprehension") (featuring Federico Zampaglione) and "Speak English", which discusses the cultural differences between Italy and England; the video for "Speak English" was shot in Brighton, where Fibra lived and worked for four years. A track off the album, entitled "Donna Famosa" ("Famous Woman"), is featured in the soundtrack of the FIFA 10 football video game.

Controcultura  (2010) 

From 18 February 2010, MTV Italia broadcast a program on Thursday nights entitled Fabri Fibra: Italy. The program was defined as a docu-drama, and included five episodes showing the lives of young people living in socially disadvantaged situations. On 4 May 2010, Fibra released a remastered album of Turbe giovanilili, entituled Turbe giovanili Remaster. On 20 July 2010, Fibra also released his first web-album, entitled Quorum, which is available in his website.

The album Controcultura (Counterculture) was released on 7 September 2010 and reached #1 in the Italian albums chart. The album has so far spawned three singles named "Vip In Trip", "Tranne Te" ("Except for You") (both peaking at #2 in the Italian singles chart), "Qualcuno Normale" ("Somebody Normal") featuring the artist Marracash and "Le Donne" ("The Women"). Fibra said that "Le Donne" music was a response to the bales of misogyny that he had to face for years, mainly because of "Mr. Simpatia".

On 1 March 2011, Fibra released the "Tranne Te: Rap Futuristico EP", an extended-play which had remixes of Tranne Te with other artists, like Redman, the French rapper Soprano and old friends from Fibra like Marracash and Dargen D'Amico. At the same month, Fibra released an online mixtape named "Venerdì 17" ("Friday 17"), available to download for free on his website. It contains many freestyles and remixes of some of his earlier work including many remixes of some of his more recent work.

The year of 2011 was also remarkable for Fibra, which he has won four consecutives awards: the platinum disc for "Controcultura", a multiplatinum disc for "Tranne Te", a "Superman" award from the TRL Awards 2011 and a "Wind Music" award.

In the Summer of 2011 Fibra launched his own record label named "Tempi Duri Records" (Hard Times Records). Young rappers Entics and Clementino have been signed to the label.

Rapstar-Non è gratis (2012) 
Fabri Fibra met Clementino in the summer of 2011 at his Controcultura Tour in Naples, and immediately they began to record together. The initial idea, as stated by Clementino in an interview, was simply to make a mixtape. Subsequently, however, both changed their minds and decided to produce a whole album under the name of Rapstar. On 9 January 2012 out double single: Ci rimani male/Chimica Brother, single opening of Non è gratis (That's Not for Free), debut album of the band, released on 31 January 2012.

Guerra e pace (2013) 
Fabri Fibra's seventh studio album, titled Guerra e pace (War and peace) was released on 5 February 2013, preceded by the EP Casus belli, which came out for free on 30 October 2012. The album, the third one by Fibra to enter at #1 in the Italian albums chart (the others being Tradimento and Controcultura), features various productions by many American producers, such as Organized Noize, Fyre Dept., Lee Major, Dot da Genius & Woodro Skillson, Rob Holladay & Mr. Franks, Antwan "Amadeus" Thompson and J.U.S.T.I.C.E. League.

Squallor(2015)
On May 21, 2014 Fabri Fibra published the works carried out from the eighth studio album via Facebook, after leaving the diatribe with Vacca behind admitting that the interest concerns a story done was over, as there was nothing vaguely anymore artistic in the last answer of Vacca. The dispute was however continued by Vacca with the song Patti Chiari, made with Entics and present on the latter's album, Entics Television. - Vol. 3.

In 2014 Fabri Fibra also starred in the film Numero zero - Alle origins of Italian rap, as well as having collaborated with rapper Nitro on the realization of the song Doggy Style, present in Machete Mixtape III. At the beginning of 2015 he collaborated with the rapper Marracash on the song Vita da star contained in Status (which was then re-proposed in a new version in which in addition to the refrain the rapper from Senigallia can also have an exclusive verse, together with his own song Playboy), with Club Dogo at the remix of Ten years ago, and updated with Nitro to the song Ong Bak, inserted in Suicidol.

On April 7, 2015 the rapper announced a surprise through Twitter the publication of the eighth studio album, entitled Squallor. On the same date, the first single Come Vasco and the video clip of the song Il rap nel mio paese were also released. The promotion of the album continued through the publication of the video clips of the songs Playboy, Alieno and E tu ci convivi, released between July and October.

Tradimento 10 Anni reloaded (2016)
In 2016 he collaborated with Mondo Marcio on the realization of the song Scoppia la bomba, contained in La freshness del Marcio, and with Jake La Furia on the single Ali e roots, featured in Fuori da qui. On May 11 of the same year he announced the re-release of the third album in the studio Betrayal on the occasion of the tenth anniversary of the latter. Called Tradimento 10 anni - Reloaded and released on June 10, the re-release contains a second CD consisting of 14 remixes of the original songs made by various and producers, including Don Joe and Big Fish, and featuring unpublished verses as singer by various rappers, such as Gemitaiz, Emis Killa and MadMan.

Fenomeno and Masterchef EP (2017) 
On March 1, 2017 Fabri Fibra released the title of the ninth studio album, Fenomeno, and the publication of the single of the same name, which took place on the 3rd of the same month.The album was released on April 7, 2017 and consists of 17 tracks, three of which in collaboration with Thegiornalisti, Roberto Saviano and Laïoung. Particular attention to the scope for tracks 16 and 17, namely No help and Thanks, where the rapper discusses the difficult relationship with the family, especially with his brother Nesli and his mother . Before the release of the album, Fabri Fibra also made available for free download a song rejected by Fenomeno, entitled Tony Hawk.

On May 5, 2017, the second single of the album, Pamplona, was released, accompanied by the relative video clip published on YouTube. On the 11th of the same month the rapper held an exclusive concert for RadioItaliaLive performing some historical pieces of his career and others taken from Fenomeno.

During the year Fabri Fibra also collaborated with Bassi Maestro on the song Non move the neck, present in My Majesty, with Izi in After Esco, contained in Pizzicato, and with Maruego in the track Oh Fra !!!, present in Tra Zenith and Nadir.

On 22 June 2017 the unpublished single Luna published a surprise for digital download, which saw the participation of Mahmood, while on 22 September the single I was thinking of you was released, third extracted from Phenomenon.

At the end of October Fabri Fibra published the publication of the EP Fenomeno - Masterchef EP, composed of unpublished songs originally discarded by Fenomeno and published on 17 November. On December 18, the rapper made available for digital download a new version of Stavo thinking about you, created in collaboration with the singer-songwriter Tiziano Ferro.

Il tempo vola 2002-2020 and collaborations (2019)
On 11 May 2018, Italian singer-songwriter Carl Brave released the single "Fotografia", featuring guest vocals by Francesca Michielin and Fabri Fibra. Fibra also appeared on Lazza's single "Lario RMX", on the remix version of "Non confondermi" by Marracash, and on the song "Stai zitto", included in Salmo's album Playlist.
In 2019, together with Mahmood and Sfera Ebbasta, he recorded the single "Calipso", credited to producers Charlie Charles and Dardust. He also contributed the mixtape Machete Mixtape Vol. 4, appearing in "Yoshi" and "Star Wars".

On 25 October 2019, the compilation album Il tempo vola 2002-2020 was released. It was preceded by the single "Come mai", recorded with Franco126 and composed by Fabri Fibra, Franco126 and Calcutta. The album was distributed in several editions, including a triple disc version with five outtakes, also released separately in the EP Outtakes, and a Single Box Edition, composed of 19 CD singles.

Fabri Fibra changes major new contact in Sony Music 

On January 23, 2020 Fabri Fibra announces that he has signed a contract with Sony Music terminating Universal Music saying textual words "Da oggi faccio parte della famiglia sonymusicitaly" ("From today on I am part of the sonymusicitaly family").

New music and collaborations (2022-present)
In January 2022 the mixtape "We the Squad Vol. 1" by the SLF group was released, featuring the song 18 years featuring Fabri Fibra.

Disputes

Rivalry with Grido and Gemelli Diversi
From 2006 to 2007, Fabri Fibra and Grido from Gemelli Diversi have been pierced with blows of dissing. In 2006 Fabri Fibra attacks Grido and Gemelli Diversi in the song Idee Stupide and Grido reply with the song Standing Ovation changing the words of the famous Applausi per Fibra. Some weeks later, in Bologna, there is the MTV Day and Fabri Fibra, with Vacca insults again Grido with another dissing changing the words of his song Oh yeah Mr. Simpatia. The latest reply arrives in 2007 with the song Bboy-Bband of Gemelli Diversi, and so ends the controversy.

Rivalry with his brother
In October 2010, his brother Nesli released an interview to the newspaper Panorama about his relationship with Fabri Fibra.

In 2013, Nesli makes peace with his brother, dedicating to him a strophe in the song Un bacio a te.

Discography

With Uomini di Mare 
 1997 - Dei di mare quest'el gruv
 1999 - Sindrome di fine millennio
 2000 - Sindrome di fine millennio (EP)
 2004 - Lato & Fabri Fibra (EP)

With Basley Click 
 2001 - "The Album"

With Teste Mobili 
 2001 - Dinamite mixtape

With Qustodi del tempo 
 1997 - Il rapimento del Vulplà

With Rapstar 
 2012 - Non è gratis

Solo career 
Studio albums
 2002 - Turbe giovanili
 2004 - Mr. Simpatia
 2006 - Tradimento  
 2007 - Bugiardo
 2009 - Chi vuole essere Fabri Fibra? 
 2010 - Controcultura 
 2013 - Guerra e Pace 
 2015 - Squallor
 2017 - Fenomeno
 2022 - Caos

Live albums
 2015 - Squallor live

Greatest hits albums
 2019 - Il tempo vola 2002-2020

EP's
 2006 - Pensieri scomodi
 2010 - Quorum
 2011 - Venerdì 17
 2012 - Casus belli EP
 2013 - Rima dopo rima
 2017 - Masterchef EP
 2019 - Outtakes

Singles

Solo career
 Applausi per Fibra (2006)
 Mal di Stomaco (2006)
 Idee Stupide (2006)
 Bugiardo (2007)
 La soluzione (2008)
 "In Italia (feat. Gianna Nannini)" (2008)
 Incomprensioni featuring Federico Zampaglione (2009)
 Speak English (2009)
 Festa Festa featuring Crookers & Dargen D'Amico (2010)
 Vip in Trip (2010)
 Tranne Te (2010)
 Qualcuno normale featuring Marracash (2011)
 Le Donne (2011)
 L'italiano balla featuring Crookers (2012)
 Pronti, Partenza, Via! (2012)
 Guerra e pace (2013)
 Ring Ring (2013)
 Panico (2013)
 Bisogna scrivere (2013)
 Niente di personale (2014)
 Il rap nel mio paese (2015)
 Come Vasco (2015)
 Alza il volume (2015)
 Playboy (2015)
 Lo sto facendo (2016)
 Fenomeno (2017)
 Pamplona (2017)
 Stavo pensando a te (2017)
 CVDM (2017)
 Fotografia featuring Carl Brave & Francesca Michielin (2018)
 Propaganda (2022) with Colapesce and Dimartino

With Rapstar
 Ci rimani male/Chimica Brother (2012)
 La luce

Awards and nominations

MTV Europe Music Awards
2008: Nomination for "Best Italian act"  
2011: Nomination for "Best Italian act"  
2017: Nomination for "Best Italian act"

World Music Awards
2014: A Nomination for his album "Guerra e Pace" "Best International Album"

MTV Italian Hip Hop Awards
2012: Nomination for "Best Video" for his 2 singles "L'italiano balla" and "La Luce feat.Clementino"

Wind Music Awards
2011: "Platinum disc" for his album Controcultura, Awards "Digital song" for his 2 singles "Tranne te" and "Vip in trip" 
2016: "Special Award for 10 Years" of his album Tradimento

FIMI Awards
2008: "Special Award to be entered for the once in FIMI charts "

TIM MTV Awards
2017: "MTV Rap Icon"

TRL Awards
2011: "Superman Award"

Mortal Kombat (Italian Competition of freestyle)
2001: first place

Special Platinum by Universal Music
2016:Special Platinum disc given by Universal Music for his 2 millions of fans on Facebook"

References

External links 
 
 

1973 births
Living people
People from Senigallia
Italian rappers
Singers from Milan